The 2012–13 Jackson State Tigers basketball team represented Jackson State University during the 2012–13 NCAA Division I men's basketball season. The Tigers, led by tenth year head coach Tevester Anderson, played their home games at the Williams Assembly Center and were members of the Southwestern Athletic Conference. They finished the season 11–18, 9–9 in SWAC play to finish in fourth place. They advanced to the semifinals of the SWAC tournament where they lost to Prairie View A&M.

Roster

Schedule

|-
!colspan=9| Exhibition

|-
!colspan=9| Regular season

|-
!colspan=9| 2013 SWAC Basketball tournament

References

Jackson State Tigers basketball seasons
Jackson State